Isostichopus macroparentheses is a species of sea cucumber in the family Stichopodidae. It is found in the Caribbean Sea and the Gulf of Mexico.

References

Animals described in 1922
Stichopodidae